The Leopard is a novel by Giuseppe Tomasi di Lampedusa.

The Leopard may also refer to:
The Leopard (1918 film), a Hungarian film featuring Bela Lugosi
The Leopard (1963 film), an Italian film based on Lampedusa's novel
The Leopard (Nesbø novel), a crime novel by Jo Nesbø
The Leopard (Reid novel), a 1958 novel by V. S. Reid

See also
Leopard (disambiguation)